Obuobia Darko-Opoku is a Ghanaian politician, journalist and philanthropist. She is a former parliamentary candidate for the National Democratic Congress in Weija-Gbawe.

Career 
She used to host the TV Africa Morning Show  dubbed 'Breakfast Live' along with actress Nikki Samonas and Khadijat. She is the host for Pause for three minutes, a motivational show which was nominated for L.E.A.D series award in 2017.

Philanthropy 
Darko-Opoku founded the Obuobia Foundation, a non profit organization which provides support to women and her constituents. Through her foundation she has made various donations to the Muslim community, the Weija Gbawe Constituency and the Ga South Municipality.

Politics 
During the 2012 and 2016 General Elections, she contested for the Weija-Gbawe parliamentary seat and lost. In 2019, she was appointed by the National Democratic Congress to be the party's Deputy National Communications Director. And she is the former Deputy Chief Executive Director of Ghana Free Zones Authority

References

Living people
21st-century Ghanaian women politicians
Ghanaian journalists
Ghanaian women writers
Ghanaian philanthropists
National Democratic Congress (Ghana) politicians
Year of birth missing (living people)
Ghanaian women journalists